Barhi may refer to places in India:

 Barhi, Hazaribagh, Jharkhand
 Barhi (community development block), an administrative division in the Barhi subdivision
 Barhi, Katni, Madhya Pradesh